Deng Gai (born March 22, 1982) is a South Sudanese former professional basketball player. A power forward, he briefly played in the National Basketball Association (NBA) and in several other leagues.  Gai was the 2005 NCAA Division I men's basketball season blocks leader.

Early life
Gai fled from Sudan in 1999 as a refugee due to the civil war. He travelled by train and a crude boat over a three-day trek to Egypt. Gai arrived in the United States and settled in Fairfield, Connecticut.

College basketball
After attending Milford Academy in Connecticut, Gai played college basketball at Fairfield University (also in the state), where he was a three-time MAAC Defensive Player of the Year and took the Stags to the MAAC semifinals in 2005. Gai graduated as number eight on the NCAA's all-time blocked shots list. 

As a senior, Gai was named first team All-MAAC, leading the nation in blocks (5.5 bpg) while blocking 10 or more shots in three contests.

Professional basketball
Gai declared for the NBA Draft in 2004, but ultimately withdrew his name. He was signed as a free agent by the Philadelphia 76ers in 2005.  

After playing in only two regular-season games for the team, Gai was waived in December 2005. He then briefly played for the USBL's Dodge City Legend and the ABA's Wilmington Sea Dawgs.  Subsequently, Gai, who had been drafted in 2005 by the CBA's Albany Patroons (2nd round, 10th overall), played for the team in the USBL, leading it in blocks. At the end of the season, he was named to the league's All-Defensive Team.

In 2007-08, Gai represented Poland's Śląsk Wrocław, but the team folded after that season.

Personal life
Gai has nine siblings. He is a cousin of fellow NBA player Luol Deng.

See also
 List of NCAA Division I men's basketball players with 13 or more blocks in a game
 List of NCAA Division I men's basketball season blocks leaders
 List of NCAA Division I men's basketball career blocks leaders

References

External links
NBA.com profile
Hoopshype.com career and profile

1982 births
Living people
American expatriate basketball people in Lithuania
American expatriate basketball people in Poland
South Sudanese emigrants to the United States
Fairfield Stags men's basketball players
Fairfield University alumni
Milford Academy alumni
People from Western Bahr el Ghazal
Philadelphia 76ers players
Power forwards (basketball)
Śląsk Wrocław basketball players
Dinka people
South Sudanese men's basketball players
Undrafted National Basketball Association players
South Sudanese refugees
Refugees in Egypt
South Sudanese expatriate basketball people in Lithuania
South Sudanese expatriate basketball people in Poland